Perquimans County Schools is the public school district responsible for Perquimans County, North Carolina.

The district consists of four schools:
Perquimans County Central School in Winfall serving grades PK-2 
Hertford Grammar School  in Hertford serving grades 3-5
Perquimans County Middle School in Winfall serving grades 6-8
Perquimans County High School in Hertford serving grades 9-12

References 

School districts in North Carolina
Education in Perquimans County, North Carolina